G0512 Chengdu–Leshan Expressway is an expressway in Sichuan, China. It was named S7, as of 2013 it is included in NTHS, hence renumbered.

Detailed Itinerary

Expressways in Sichuan
0512